Coastal Empire Beer Co. is a craft brewery founded in 2010 by Kevin Haborak in Savannah, Georgia.

History
The brewery is currently brewing out of their 79 Ross Road facility in  Savannah,  Georgia. Coastal Empire Beer won first place in the 2011 Savannah Craft Brew Fest People's Choice category for their Savannah Brown Ale.

Coastal Empire Beer Co. is Savannah's most award-winning production brewery, they have won 9 medals in international beer competitions.

Beers
Savannah Brown Ale
Tybee Island Blonde
Pale Ale

References

Beer brewing companies based in Georgia (U.S. state)
Companies based in Savannah, Georgia